The 2022 Emperor's Cup final was the final of the 2022 Emperor's Cup, the 102nd edition of the Emperor's Cup. Ventforet Kofu played their first-ever Emperor's Cup final, as their past best performances were defeats in the quarter-finals in 2006, 2013, 2018, and 2019. It is also their first-ever elite cup final, as Kofu never got past the quarter-finals in the J.League Cup. Sanfrecce Hiroshima had their sixth major chance to win the trophy in the J.League era, having qualified for the final five times; in 1995, 1996, 1999, 2007, and 2013, losing in all five finals. As J2 League's Ventforet Kofu became one of the finalists, this 2022 Final was the seventh of the competition to feature at least one team from the second tier of Japanese football, with a J2 League team appearing in the competition's final for the first time in 1980. 

After the match, leaving as the final winners of the 2022 Emperor's Cup, Ventforet Kofu were granted the right to qualify for the 2023–24 AFC Champions League. For the second consecutive time, a club playing in the second division will be playing in a continental competition, repeating Jeonnam Dragons' feat at the 2022 AFC Champions League.

Teams

Road to the final

Format 
The final was played in a single leg format. It was hurried to be played in mid-October, instead of January, as usual, due to the schedule conflict with the realization and holding period of the 2022 FIFA World Cup. Should the match remained tied after regulation time, extra time would have been added. Would it necessary, a penalty shoot-out would have been used to decide the winning team.

Details

References

External links 
 Emperor's Cup JFA 102nd Japan Football Championship 
 天皇杯 JFA 第102回全日本サッカー選手権大会 

 

Emperor's Cup
2022 in Japanese football
Sanfrecce Hiroshima matches
2022 in Asian football
2022 in Japanese sport